Amboasary (also Amboasary Gara) is a rural commune in Madagascar. It belongs to the district of Moramanga, which is a part of Alaotra-Mangoro Region. The population of the commune was 13,601 in 2018.

Primary and junior level secondary education are available in town. The majority 60% of the population of the commune are farmers.  The most important crop is rice, while other important products are cassava and taro.  Industry and services provide employment for 8% and 22% of the population, respectively. Additionally fishing employs 10% of the population.
Amboasary Gara is a railway station on the Moramanga - Alaotra Lake line.

See also
 Sahamaitso (river)

Transport
The town is situated at the RN44 and the railway line Moramanga – Ambatondrazaka (TCE).

References and notes 

Populated places in Alaotra-Mangoro